Testosterone buciclate (developmental code names 20 Aet-1, CDB-1781) is a synthetic, injected anabolic–androgenic steroid (AAS) which was never marketed. It was developed in collaboration by the Contraceptive Development Branch (CDB) of the National Institute of Child Health and Human Development (NICHD) and the World Health Organization (WHO) in the 1970s and early 1980s for use in androgen replacement therapy for male hypogonadism and as a potential male contraceptive. It was first described in 1986. The medication is an androgen ester – specifically, the C17β buciclate (4-butylcyclohexane-1-carboxylate) ester of testosterone – and is a prodrug of testosterone with a very long duration of action when used as a depot via intramuscular injection. Testosterone buciclate is formulated as a microcrystalline aqueous suspension with a defined particle size of at least 75% in the range of 10 to 50 μm.

A single intramuscular injection of testosterone buciclate has been found to produce physiological levels of testosterone within the normal range in hypogonadal men for 3 to 4 months. The elimination half-life and mean residence time (average amount of time a single molecule of drug stays in the body) of testosterone buciclate were found to be 29.5 days and 60.0 days, respectively, whereas those of testosterone enanthate in castor oil were only 4.5 days and 8.5 days. Testosterone buciclate also lasts longer than testosterone undecanoate, which has elimination half-lives and mean residence times of 20.9 days and 34.9 days in tea seed oil and 33.9 days and 36.0 days in castor oil, respectively. In addition, there is a spike in testosterone levels with testosterone enanthate and testosterone undecanoate that is not seen with testosterone buciclate, with which levels stay highly uniform and decrease very gradually and progressively. Testosterone buciclate can maintain testosterone levels in the normal male range for up to 20 weeks with a single intramuscular injection.

Testosterone buciclate is able to reversibly and completely suppress spermatogenesis in men when used at sufficiently high dosages. As such, the results of clinical studies for use of testosterone buciclate as a male contraceptive were promising, and trials continued as late as 1995, but progress ultimately came to a standstill because the WHO was unable to find an industry partner willing to continue the development of the drug. Because of this, the WHO backed away from testosterone buciclate and focused its research instead on testosterone undecanoate, which is also very long-lasting and has the advantage of having already been marketed and approved for medical use.

See also
 List of androgen esters § Testosterone esters
 Polytestosterone phloretin phosphate

References

Abandoned drugs
Androgens and anabolic steroids
Androstanes
Buciclate esters
Contraception for males
Ketones
Testosterone esters